Summer storm may refer to:

Summer Storm (1944 film), an American film
Summer Storm (1949 film), a French film
Summer Storm (2004 film), a German film
Summer Storm Festival, an annual music festival held in Bangalore, India